In mathematics, in the field of combinatorics, the q-Vandermonde identity is a q-analogue of the Chu–Vandermonde identity.  Using standard notation for q-binomial coefficients, the identity states that

The nonzero contributions to this sum come from values of j such that the q-binomial coefficients on the right side are nonzero, that is,

Other conventions
As is typical for q-analogues, the q-Vandermonde identity can be rewritten in a number of ways. In the conventions common in applications to quantum groups, a different q-binomial coefficient is used.

Using this q-binomial coefficient, the q-Vandermonde identity can be written in the form

Proof
As with the (non-q) Chu–Vandermonde identity, there are several possible proofs of the q-Vandermonde identity.  The following proof uses the q-binomial theorem.

One standard proof of the Chu–Vandermonde identity is to expand the product  in two different ways.  Following Stanley, we can tweak this proof to prove the q-Vandermonde identity, as well.  First, observe that the product

can be expanded by the q-binomial theorem as

Less obviously, we can write

and we may expand both subproducts separately using the q-binomial theorem.  This yields

Multiplying this latter product out and combining like terms gives 

This argument may also be phrased in terms of expanding the product  in two different ways, where A and B are operators (for example, a pair of matrices) that "q-commute," that is, that satisfy BA = qAB.

Notes

References 
 
 
 Exton, H. (1983), q-Hypergeometric Functions and Applications, New York:  Halstead Press, Chichester: Ellis Horwood, 1983, 
 
 
 

Combinatorics
Q-analogs
Mathematical identities